HMS Aid was a Royal Navy transport ship launched in 1809 at Kings Lynn. She was the name ship of a six-vessel class of purpose built storeships, the only vessels built as such during the Napoleonic Wars.

Ordered in 1808, she was built by Mr Thomas Brindley at King's Lynn, Norfolk.

She was converted to a survey ship between December 1816 and March 1817 at Sheerness. Commander William Henry Smyth commissioned her in January 1817.

There they loaded columns, marbles, and other antiquities to bring back to England.

Aid was renamed HMS Adventure in 1821.

As HMS Adventure the ship was deployed for five years between 1826 and 1830 in a survey of Patagonia, under the command of Captain Phillip King. The ship was accompanied by HMS Beagle, a slightly smaller vessel (90.3 ft in length), who was on her first of three major voyages. Adventure was sold in Plymouth by the Admiralty on 19 May 1853 for £750.

See also
 European and American voyages of scientific exploration

Citations

References
 
 Smyth, William Henry  (1854) The Mediterranean: A Memoir Physical, Historical, and Nautical (John W. Parker and Son).

Survey vessels of the Royal Navy
Victorian-era auxiliary ships of the United Kingdom
1809 ships
Aid-class storeship